Studio D was the women's unit of the National Film Board of Canada (NFB) and the world's first publicly funded feminist filmmaking studio. In its 22-year history, it produced 134 films and won 3 Academy Awards. Cinema Canada once called it the "Jewel in the Crown Corporation."

Many of Canada's most notable women filmmakers passed through Studio D, as employees, freelancers, or trainees, including Bonnie Sherr Klein, Lynne Fernie, and Justine Pimlott. Studio D was also instrumental in training and supporting women in key production roles such as cinematography (including Susan Trow and Zoe Dirse); sound (including Aerlyn Weissman and Jackie Newell); and editing (including Anne Henderson and Ginny Stikeman). Decades before the #TimesUp movement, Studio D "left an important legacy: a commitment to women’s filmmaking and cultural diversity that is now deeply anchored in every studio [at the NFB]."

Shannon leadership (1974–86)

Founding 
Studio D was founded by Kathleen Shannon in 1974. She credits the success of her series, Working Mothers, as well as the En tant que femmes series by Anne Claire Poirier for proving that there was both a market for films about women’s issues and women eager for filmmaking careers. The NFB received funding from the Women’s Program of the Secretary of State in recognition of International Women’s Year, which was split equally between Poirier and Shannon. In the end, Poirier decided against launching a French-language women’s unit and the money was used to fund a film already in production. Shannon, however, used the money to launch Studio D. The priorities for Studio D were to provide employment and training opportunities for women, meet the information needs of women, bring women's perspectives to social issues and, as Shannon phrased it, facilitate "exploring our creativity in our own way."

Its first project was a training program for thirty women that resulted in a series of one-minute films woven together as one film under the name Just-a-Minute. It was the first ever “quilt film,” a unique genre of collaborative short filmmaking often used by Studio D to stretch budgets and provide training.

At first, Studio D relied on freelancers and the few women already employed by the NFB. The first members were Yuki Yoshida and Margaret Pettigrew, both producers, and Shannon as Executive Producer. Great Grand Mother became the first film released by Studio D, but it had already begun production by independent filmmakers Anne Wheeler and Lorna Rasmussen through their company, Filmwest Associates. A portrayal of early women settlers on the Canadian prairies, it combined interviews, recreations, and voice-over narratives from archival letters and diaries. Shannon recalled, “When we previewed it for the branch program committee, we used some footage of an elder woman, a midwife who also dressed bodies for burial. I thought it was riveting. The head of the committee pronounced it boring.”

The films produced in the beginning were very much within the cinema verité tradition of the NFB and Challenge for Change. An emphasis on the recuperation of Canadian’s women’s history led to the re-release of NFB films from the 1940s and 50s as an educational package called How They Saw Us in 1977. The use of inter-titles to re-contextualize the films from a feminist perspective drew attention to "the evidence of the patriarchal camera eye" of the NFB.

More women joined the Studio, including Challenge for Change veterans Bonnie Sherr Klein (who had left the NFB but returned for the chance to work in an all-woman environment) and Dorothy Todd Hénaut. Beverly Shaffer was the first Studio D filmmaker to win an Academy Award in 1979 for her film, I'll Find a Way, part of the Children of Canada Series. Other early members included Ginny Stikeman, who later rose to become Executive Producer of Studio D, Margaret Wescott, Gloria Demers, Susan Huyke, Margaret Wong, and Signe Johansson. Freelancers who collaborated with Studio D included Anne Henderson, Irene Angelico, Donna Read, Sharon McGowan, and Moira Simpson.

Studio success 
Following their first Academy Award win in 1979, Studio D enjoyed a string of critically and commercially successful films, unprecedented in NFB history.

In 1981, it released its first feature-length documentary film, Not a Love Story: A Film About Pornography. Directed by Bonnie Sherr Klein and featuring Lindalee Tracey, it was a foray into various facets of the sex entertainment industry and the intensifying feminist debates about pornography. The film featured interviews with women working at Times Square's notorious Show World Sex Emporium, porn star Marc Stevens ("Mr. "), and Hustler photographer Suze Randall. Critics complained, however, that their voices were drowned out by a cacophony of American anti-porn feminists including Susan Griffin, Robin Morgan, Kate Millett and Kathleen Barry. Many accused the film of being pro-censorship, an irony given that it was censored in both Ontario and Saskatchewan. Not a Love Story was the first Studio D film to receive international theatrical release, including a benefit premiere in New York City for Ms. magazine.

One year later, Studio D again courted controversy with the film If You Love this Planet. Terre Nash directed the film that centred on a lecture given by Dr. Helen Caldicott about the immanent dangers of nuclear weapon proliferation. The NFB officer in charge of distribution for the United States warned that the film may harm relations with the Reagan administration, and sought support from Canada’s External Affairs office to stop the film’s release. The film won the Academy Award for best documentary short in 1982, and its influences can be seen in Al Gore’s An Inconvenient Truth.

In 1983, Studio D won its third and last Academy Award for Flamenco at 5:15. Directed by Cynthia Scott, it was a marked departure from the controversy that had swirled around the studio. The film showcased the instructors and senior students in a master class in Flamenco at the National Ballet School of Canada. The New York Times praised it as “a small jewel of a documentary” that demonstrates the leap from studying dance to becoming an artist.

Behind the Veil, a sprawling documentary “which seeks nothing more than to examine critically the history of women in the Christian church of the Western world,” provided a rare glimpse into the lives of cloistered and apostolic nuns. Abortion: Stories From North and South was the first Studio D film with an all-women (instead of majority) crew. Documenting women’s stories about accessing abortion services in Canada, Columbia, Ireland, Japan, Peru, and Thailand, the film won the Grand Prize at the San Francisco International Film Festival.

Despite such successes, Studio D was not without its critics - including from the wider feminist film community. Its heavy-handed social realism was seen as overly didactic and out of touch with the experimental and political advancements in feminist film theory. In her review of Not a Love Story, Susan Barrowclough outlined the formulaic approach to filmmaking by Studio D: "realist narrative, cinema verité, and underlying moral didactism, claim and counter-claim all sewn up and closed with a reassuring voice-over." Critics frequently referenced its "standard meta-narrative of women's oppression." Janis Cole and Holly Dale recalled Shannon insisting that their film, Hookers on Davie, focus only on women forced into sex work and cut out trans workers. Their refusal to conform to Studio D's "bourgeois norms" and victim narrative resulted in them pulling the film from the studio and completing it independently.

Studio D's training and internship programs helped build women filmmakers in all a reas of production. In 1984 it brought 20 women age 18-25 for a nine-month intensive residency funded by the Secretary of State’s International Youth Year Secretariat. The films Beyond Memory (dir. Louise Lamarre), First Take Double Take (dir. Paula Fairfield), and Thin Dreams (dir. Susie Mah) were produced by this program. A year later, a new internship program made possible films such as DES: An Uncertain Legacy (dir. Sidonie Kerr), The Impossible Takes a Little Longer (dir. Anne Henderson), and Spirit of the Kata (dir. Sharon McGowan).

Smaller budget films were produced within Studio D by the Federal Women’s Film Program. Launched in 1980, it was a unique partnership with various federal government departments to produce documentaries about women’s issues that were identified as government priorities. These included women’s labor participation (Women and Work Series), Indigenous women’s leadership (Doctor, Lawyer, Indian Chief), gender-based violence (The Next Step Series), women in agriculture (Gathering Strength Series) and women and aging (When the Day Comes, The Power of Time, and Pills Unlimited). The program was the only one in the studio to require versions of the films in both official languages (English and French). In 1986, the newly formed Regards de femmes program in the NFB's French studio joined the initiative.

Budget reductions 
By the mid-eighties, Studio D was receiving a budget on par with the other studios, but it was still not enough to respond to the steady requests from women across the country for more training and financial support. It didn't help that other studios – including regional offices – sent women to Studio D to protect their own budgets. Furthermore, while other studios within NFB could rely on in-house crew members, Studio D had a heavier contract budget in order to hire more women. In 1980, only 30 women held full-time technical positions within the NFB. By 1986, the number shrunk to 23, compared to 130 men.

Despite Shannon’s lobbying for more funds, it was the only English filmmaking studio to have its budget cut in 1984. Its overall share of the NFB budget dropped to 6% in 1986. The Federal Women’s Film Program was cancelled two years later. However, NFB’s five-year plan promised to “allocate increased resources to women’s filmmakers and … maintain its support of Studio D, the women’s film unit, enabling it to meet a national mandate.” That, coupled with recently passed legislation enshrining employment equity, prompted a public study. Equality and Access: A New Social Contract was the first of what was to be many studies on the lack of opportunities for women at the NFB. It showed that there were more than two times as many men filmmakers as women, and that slightly more than half of all women employed at the NFB were in support staff roles. The newly appointed Employment Equity Director at the NFB also drew attention to the lack of racial, ethnic, and Indigenous diversity within the NFB. However, NFB's Commissioner, François Macerola claimed that he was "not ready for an employment equity program involving the disabled, natives and visible minorities" and would maintain focus on women for the foreseeable future. At the same time, he criticized Studio D in his report to the House of Commons Standing Committee on Culture and Communication, and declared that he was deliberately holding back funds to them. “First of all, I think Studio D is very important. Nevertheless, it is presenting only one point of view. What I am planning to do is really to open the place to women at the NFB. I want to have more and more films produced by women for women. [What] I mean by that [is] that I will not give all the financial resources to Studio D.”

The NFB created the Women's Film Development Group, originally made up of marketing managers hired into the regional studios to promote Studio D films, implement training programs, and recruit women filmmakers. The benefits of this initiative led to the launch of regional feminist film festivals such as herland Feminist Film Festival in Calgary and the St. John's International Women's Film Festival. Early programming for these festivals relied heavily on Studio D films. Bonnie Thompson, of the NorthWest Studio in Edmonton, recalls, "It was so radical for women to see themselves." Despite these advances across the country, Studio D was under fire both within the NFB, which kept cutting its budget, and from independent and grassroots feminist filmmakers who demanded more resources without having to go through Studio D. In October 1986, Shannon resigned as Executive Producer, although she continued with Studio D as a producer. Ginny Stikeman was appointed Interim Executive Producer until Rina Fraticelli took over the role in March 1987.

Fraticelli leadership (1987–90) 
At the time of her appointment as Executive Producer in 1987, Rina Fraticelli was not a filmmaker, but a dramaturge and community organizer. Her pan-national networks were expected to bring fresh insights to Studio D, especially "women who represent the diversity of points of view within the women's movement." With a slashed budget and a slate of unfinished films by resident filmmakers, her first year proved challenging.

By the mid-1980s, Canada's women's movement was confronting its own internalized racism and homophobia. Studio D was distanced from some of the more acrimonious debates because of their status and location within the NFB, on the outskirts of Montreal. Although its members were committed feminists, "we really weren't a part of anything except for our world," Klein later acknowledged. Studio D's staff had remained virtually unchanged since its beginning, raising concerns by Fraticelli about "a conflict between fully employing staff filmmakers and the need to extend our accessibility in the women's community.

In 1989, with the support of Kathleen Shannon, Fraticelli transferred the remaining six resident Studio D filmmakers to other NFB units: Bonnie Sherr Klein (who, at that time was on long-term disability), Dorothy Todd Hénaut, Margaret Wescott, Susan Huycke, Cynthia Scott, and Beverly Shaffer. Shannon remained in her reduced role as producer. The goal was to expand Studio D's financial reach to support women of colour and other marginalized filmmakers across the country. "Instead of working to maintain and protect the work of a privileged few, Studio D had attempted and would continue to attempt to expand the rights of all." By that time, the budget had been reduced from $1 million to $795,000, much of it tied to salaries. Despite the fact that the filmmakers remained employees of the NFB, and the public message was that it was a mutual decision, many spoke off the record of being "turfed out." With the exception of Shannon, none of the original resident filmmakers directed a film for Studio D again.

In the place of resident filmmakers came a new generation of artists from across the country. While only seventeen films were released during Fraticelli's tenure, among them were Shaffer's last film for Studio D (in production prior to Fraticelli's appointment), the groundbreaking documentary on child sexual abuse, To a Safer Place, and Gail Singer's short excerpt from Abortion: Stories From North and South, A Mother and Daughter on Abortion, which renewed public criticism of Studio D by REAL Women of Canada. Fraticelli had brokered an innovative partnership with renowned poet Dionne Brand to develop a series of films on Black Canadian women's experiences, called Women at the Well, and spearheaded Five Feminist Minutes, a continuation of Studio D's practice of "quilt films", which screened at most feminist film festivals across the country. Arguably her most significant contribution to Studio D was the creation of the New Initiatives in Film program. Co-created by Fraticelli and filmmaker Sylvia Hamilton, the program's mandate was to provide filmmaking opportunities to women of colour and First Nations women. Fraticelli had ambitions to break with the in-house style that was heavily influenced by Shannon's aversion to artistic or experimental documentary. "As far as I was concerned, we had the right to be artists, not just social workers," Fraticelli explains. "I wanted these women filmmakers to challenge the form of filmmaking, as well as the context, and I think other women at the studio had a problem with this."

Despite Fraticelli's advancement of both diversity and artistry within Studio D, she faced insurmountable challenges. She was accused of "brutal behaviour," by past members of Studio D, and frustrated by the NFB's budget cutting and broken promises which ricocheted into criticism by independent filmmakers that they were not being given the opportunities she allegedly promised. She left in March 1990. Two years later, Shannon retired.

Stikeman leadership (1990–96) 
Rina Fraticelli's parting words as she left Studio D was to warn that the NFB was "slowly dying away." It was left to Ginny Stikeman, one of the original members of Studio D, to oversee the long decline and eventual closure of the women's unit as the last of its Executive Producers. Fraticelli had laid the groundwork for some of the Studio's most ambitious films and Stikeman's experience as an editor and producer helped shepherd them to completion. In particular, Stikeman played an instrumental role in seeing two controversial feature-length films completed: Forbidden Love: The Unashamed Stories of Lesbian Lives and Studio D's only dramatic feature, Skin Deep, about a transman's obsessive relationship with a lesbian filmmaker. Also produced under Stikeman was Singer's feature-length documentary Wisecracks, about women comedians, which was called "ahead of its time." Stikeman continued to oversee New Initiatives in Film, which was frequently embroiled in interpersonal conflicts and accusations of institutional racism.

New Initiatives in Film (1990–1996) 
Fraticelli and Sylvia Hamilton envisioned New Initiatives in Film as a multi-year funded program along the lines of the Federal Women's Film Program, but the NFB would only commit to one year at a time, with increasingly limited funds. Furthermore, filmmakers were hired only on short-term contracts.  NIF was only supposed to represent Studio D's contribution to a NFB-wide effort to improve racial and ethnic diversity. However, NFB's Commissioner, François Macerola claimed that he was "not ready for an employment equity program involving the disabled, natives and visible minorities" and would maintain focus on women for the foreseeable future. A 1997 report Diversity On and Off the Screen claimed, "year after year NIF was the only thing NFB management had to show." The month before Fraticelli resigned was the first time in its history that the National Film Board recognized Black History Month. It had only two films to screen: Black Mother Black Daughter, by NIF co-creator Hamilton and NIF producer Claire Prieto, which won the 1990 NFB Kathleen Shannon Award; and Older, Stronger, Wiser, by Prieto and Brand, which was the first in the Women at the Well series of films on Black Canadian women.

NIF offered multiple services and programs: short institutes for aspiring but untrained filmmakers, longer in-house internships for artists to complete a short film, and support to established filmmakers. In addition, it developed a resource bank of filmmakers and production personnel in Canada who were either Indigenous or women of colour. Unfortunately, the program was rife with interpersonal conflicts. By 1994, acrimony had spilled out into the wider film community. A brief exposé of NIF claimed it was "another example of cultural ghettoization, that instead of including marginalized groups in the mainstream, NIF represents how factionalized and segregated our society has become." Their first program coordinator, Reneé Du Plessis, herself a light-skinned woman of colour originally from South Africa, was fired and subsequently sued the NFB (the case was settled out of court). "I was accused by the advisory board and Studio D of being inflexible and insensitive to women of colour. I was also accused of contributing to systemic racism," Du Plessis says. "Apparently, I contributed to systemic racism because I didn't let them do what they wanted to do. There wasn't much time, and some of these women (who had never been to Montreal) wanted to go shopping." In fact, many NIF trainees were leaving NFB headquarters to receive support and mentoring from Montreal-based filmmakers who were more encouraging of experimental and political documentary filmmaking. In response to Du Plessis' criticism, they spoke anonymously (because Studio D "was the only game in town"), complaining that, "Studio D hasn't progressed in the last 20 years. They've been making the same damn films that carry the same message: women are victims. At first, white women made them, now they're getting women of colour to make the same thing."

Despite criticisms of structural and cultural racism, the New Initiatives in Film series brought to light both emergent filmmakers and heretofore untold stories. The Women at the Well series by Dionne Brand was among the most high-profile venture by NIF. Already an internationally heralded poet, Brand co-directed Sisters in the Struggle (1992) with Stikeman, and solo directed Long Time Comin''' (1993). In 1996, she made one last film with Studio D, Listening for Something: Adrienne Rich and Dionne Brand in Conversation. NIF also oversaw the production of Michelle Wong's Return Home (1992) and Doris Nipp's Under the Willow Tree, both explorations of Chinese immigrant women. Loretta Todd's film Hands of History (1994) was a lush profile of four major Indigenous feminist artists, including Jane Ash Poitras. Norma Bailey's Women Under Shadows (1991) traced Métis filmmaker Christine Welsh's journey to discover her Indigenous great grandmother, Margaret Taylor, who was the consort to Hudson’s Bay Company Governor George Simpson. Welsh herself directed Keepers of the Fire (1994), about Indigenous women land defenders.

 Studio D's closure (1996) 
In March 1996, the NFB announced that it would be closing down Studio D. By that time, it had already released most of its filmmakers from all other studios (Shaffer was among three in-house directors left). The plan was to end the studio structure and replace it with production streams so that NFB films would no longer be made in-house but in partnership with independent artists and production companies. While a documentary production stream would continue, the NFB decided against a women's stream. Production had been slowly grinding to a halt in Studio D. Skin Deep was its only release in 1995. Seven films were rushed to completion before the studio ended, with some Studio D productions like Margaret Wescott's sprawling documentary on three centuries of lesbian life, Stolen Moments, finally released one year later.

Kathleen Shannon publicly criticized the move: "This a loss of a perspective that's different from the corporate culture. Because when we never see our own perceptions validated--most of us are too afraid to speak up. It seems so, particularly right now--we're in this stranglehold that corporations have on us, and it's extremely important for us to have some validation and empowerment." Gail Singer also spoke out against the decision: "This is not a wise decision, but I think it is almost inevitable in the current, careless mood of cutbacks." Others warned that cutting Studio D just at the point where filmmaking equity had just been met within the NFB would send it backwards. However, others in the feminist film community felt that Studio D was no longer relevant. Barbara Janes, the NFB's Director-General of English Programming, stated adamantly at the time, "Studio D had been in existence for twenty years. In that time, society changed a lot. But Studio D kept the mindset of 1975, fighting battles already won." Some suggested Studio D had turned into “a kind of ghetto for women at the NFB, left behind in the 1980’s move into the production of more high-profile feature films.”

 Legacy 
In 2016, the NFB announced a new gender parity initiative in response to successive annual reports by Women in View on inequity in Canadian film and television. While its president, Claude Joli-Coeur, insisted that director and producer credits were near parity, he acknowledged that production personnel statistics were much worse, with women representing only 24% of editors and 12% of cinematographers. The NFB claimed they were uniquely situated to meet an ambitious target of full parity in credits and funding by 2020 because they were "a Canadian film industry leader in gender equality that made history in 1974 when it established Studio D, the world’s first production unit devoted exclusively to work by women filmmakers."

In a 2017 article for Time magazine, film critic Matthew Hays suggested Hollywood look north to solve its gender problem. He claimed that Studio D films "remain vital, fresh and pertinent, and in many cases were films made by first-time directors. They prove that when a space is carved out for women to pursue filmmaking, they can succeed on their own terms, and create cinema that is distinct, powerful and every bit as full of creative ideas as films made by men." The 2019 Hot Docs Festival in Toronto featured a retrospective of Studio D films, and a revival of Five Feminist Minutes, called Five Feminist Minutes 2019.'' It also hosted a Doc Summit, "Dare to Be Studio D" in which contemporary filmmakers Ann Marie Fleming, Alexandra Lazarowich, and Glace Lawrence shared the stage with Studio D alumni Zoe Dirse, Rina Fraticelli and Gail Singer, as well as NFB Executive Director Michelle Van Beusekom. It was billed as an opportunity to "revisit the studio’s monumental impact on feminist film culture and look to the future of inclusive, diverse docs that implement social change in Canada."

Studio D was far from the only feminist film organization in Canada, and some contemporary assessments argue that its prominence overshadows the work of grassroots collectives like the Isis Women and Film Festival that toured eighteen cities in 1974. Beginning in 1972, feminist media collectives such as Reelfeelings and Groupe Intervention Vidéo were not only screening films in community settings but also engaging in guerilla film tactics such as occupations. At least seven different feminist film and video collectives and festivals launched in 1973. Its institutional foundation and Shannon's own feminist ideology prevented it from taking more aesthetic and political risks, particularly in its explorations of race and sexual identity, until very late. Its accomplishments and criticism raises questions about the fraught dynamics of feminist activism and state funding.

Studio D filmography

References

External links 
 NFB Studio D Channel
 Canadian Women Film Directors Database
 NFB Blog entries on Studio D
 A History of Women's Filmmaking at the National Film Board of Canada

1974 establishments in Canada
1996 disestablishments in Canada
Feminism in Canada
National Film Board of Canada
Women filmmakers
Former Crown corporations of Canada